Mergie is a settlement in Aberdeenshire approximately six miles west of Stonehaven, Scotland.  Situated in the former Kincardineshire slightly south of the Slug Road.

Early area history
Mergie is in an area of significant prehistoric and historic fabric.  Roman legions marched from Raedykes to Normandykes Roman Camp on a route not far from Mergie as they sought higher ground evading the bogs of Red Moss and other low-lying mosses associated with the Burn of Muchalls. That march used the Elsick Mounth, one of the ancient trackways crossing the Mounth of the Grampian Mountains, lying west of Netherley.

See also
Rickarton
Tewel

References

Villages in Aberdeenshire